On 11 December 1988, an Ilyushin Il-76M aircraft crashed. Operated by the Soviet Air Force, the flight participated in relief efforts after an earthquake struck Armenia on 7 December. The aircraft crashed into a mountainside during an attempt to land at Leninakan, Armenia (then part of the Soviet Union), killing 77 of the 78 occupants on board.

Aircraft
The aircraft was ten years old at the time of the accident having first flown in 1978. The passengers were personnel of the Soviet Armed Forces—50 Azerbaijani, 13 Lezgin, 11 Russians, 2 Tatars, 1 Armenian and 1 Jew. The nine crew were Russian.

Accident
The aircraft flew as part of the relief effort following the Spitak earthquake on 7 December. It transported military personnel and equipment to aid in relief efforts following the earthquake. It departed Baku-Bina International Airport in Azerbaijan for Leninakan Airport in Armenia. It struck the side of a mountain during its descent. All nine crew and 68 of the 69 passengers died. One passenger survived the crash because he had been sleeping in a Kamaz truck loaded with mattresses at the rear of the aircraft.

Cause
A day after the crash, an Armenian spokesperson said the aircraft crashed after colliding with a helicopter while approaching the airport but news agencies made no mention of this claim. Speculations that it was shot down by Armenians also arose. The crash was eventually attributed to an incorrect altimeter setting by the flight crew which gave an incorrect altitude reading that was  higher than the actual altitude. Crew fatigue was cited as a factor in the crash—the flight crew was not given enough rest after carrying out multiple relief flights the previous day.

References

Aviation accidents and incidents in 1988
1988 disasters in the Soviet Union
Accidents and incidents involving the Ilyushin Il-76
Aviation accidents and incidents in Armenia
December 1988 events in Asia
Gyumri
1988 in Armenia
Aviation accidents and incidents in the Soviet Union